Borsato is a surname. Notable people with the surname include:

 Diane Borsato (born 1973), Canadian visual artist
 Giuseppe Borsato (1771–1849), Italian painter
 Luciano Borsato (born 1966), Canadian ice hockey player
 Marco Borsato (born 1966), Dutch singer